Prince Chudadhuj Dharadilok, Prince of Phetchabun, (4  July 1892– 8 July 1923) was a son of King Chulalongkorn and Queen Saovabha of Thailand. He was one of the most senior Thai princes during the rule of his full brother, King Vajiravudh.

Biography
Prince Chudadhuj was born on 5 July 1892 at Morakut Sutta Palace, Ko Sichang, Chonburi province in which the King gave the name of the royal court Phra Chuthathut Palace according to the name "Prince Chudadhuj" who was born at that place. When he was young, he was named "Thun Kramom Tew". King Chulalongkorn please Prince Chudadhuj went to study in England along with Prince Asdang Dejavudh and Prince Mahidol Adulyadej. In 1905 he studied at Magdalene College, University of Cambridge and then he returned to government service as a professor at Chulalongkorn University, He taught English at  Faculty of Political Science on 4 October  1918, and was the commander of Poh-Chang Academy of Arts in 1918.

Prince Chudadhuj's passion for art and played the grand piano, harp, and violin, theater arts and has written an ancient drama.

Prince Chudadhuj died at Sa Pathum Palace on 8 July 1923 at 31 years old.

Marriage and family
Prince Chudadhuj married Princess Bunchiradhorn Jumbala - however, he did not produce a child with her.

He had two illegitimate children with commoners, who nevertheless received the royal rank of Phra Worawong Ther Phra Ong Chao :
 Princess Sudasiri Sobha (1918–1998) produced by Mom La-or Sirisambandh, who married Prince Suvinit Kitiyakara had issue.
 Prince Varananda Dhavaj (1920–1990)  produced by Mom Ravi Kayananda, who married Pamela Smee, Princess Galyani Vadhana Mahidol, Princess Kawkaewprakaikavila Na Chiangmai and Srisalai Suchatwut. had issue with Smee.

Ancestors

See also
 1924 Palace Law of Succession

1892 births
1923 deaths
19th-century Thai people
Thai male Chao Fa
Chudadhut family
Knights Grand Cordon of the Order of Chula Chom Klao
Knights of the Ratana Varabhorn Order of Merit
Academic staff of Chulalongkorn University
Alumni of Magdalene College, Cambridge
People from Chonburi province
Children of Chulalongkorn
19th-century Chakri dynasty
20th-century Chakri dynasty
Sons of kings